al-Ājurrūmiyyah in full  is a 13th-century book of Arabic grammar.  Very concise for easy memorization, it formed the foundation of a beginner's education in Classical Arabic learning in Arab societies at the time and was one of the first books to be memorized after the Qur'an along with the Alfiya. It was written by the Moroccan, Berber Abu 'Abd Allah Sidi Muhammad ibn Da'ud as-Sanhaji (aka "Ibn Ajarrum") (d. 1324).

In the Preface to his translation of the work, the Rev. J. J. S. Perowne writes:

"The "Ājrūmīya" is a well-known and useful compendium of Arabic Syntax. It is regarded by the Arabs themselves as a standard educational work; and various editions of it have appeared in Boulak, Algiers, and other places. But it is not always easy to meet with these in this country..."

References

External links

 Al-Ajurrumiyya: Commento e traduzione italiana, Sarah Mattioli

 The Explanation of al-Ajirroumiyyah Based on Mufti of Makkah Ahmad bin Zayni Dahlan
 LibriVox recording of Al Adjrumiieh (The Arabic Text with the Vowels; and An English Translation)

13th-century Arabic books
Arabic grammar books